APM, apm, or Apm may refer to:

Technology

Computer technology 
Active policy management, a discipline within enterprise software
Advanced Power Management, a legacy technology in personal computers
Apple Partition Map, computer disk partition scheme
Application performance management, a discipline within systems management

Other 
Accurate Pistonic Motion, a line of stereo speakers using square drivers manufactured by Sony
ArduPilotMega (APM), an open source unmanned aerial vehicle (UAV) platform
Attached Pressurized Module, the former name of the Columbus module of the International Space Station
Automated people mover, a driverless train often used in large airports
Atomically precise manufacturing

Social sciences and management 
Agile project management, a style of project management for agile software development projects
Application portfolio management
Advanced Progressive Matrices, a subset of Raven's Progressive Matrices which is an intelligence test

Police and military 
Australian Police Medal, awarded for distinguished service by a member of an Australian police force
Assistant Provost Marshal, a military rank
Anti-personnel mine, a type of explosive used against people
Army of the Republic of Macedonia

Organizations and companies

United States 
American Peace Mobilization, a communist front group active before the Nazi invasion of the Soviet Union during World War II
American Poetry Museum, Washington D.C., USA
American Public Media, the production and distribution arm of Minnesota Public Radio (MPR)
Applied Micro Circuits Corporation, a fabless semiconductor company in the Silicon Valley
Associated Production Music, a large production music company

China 
Apm (Hong Kong), a shopping centre and office tower in Kwun Tong, New Kowloon, Hong Kong
Beijing apm, a shopping center and office tower in Beijing, China

United Kingdom 
Association for Project Management in the United Kingdom
K Sports F.C., a football club in England previously known as APM

Other 
APM Monaco, a fashion jewelry company
APM Terminals, container terminal operator based in the Netherlands
Allied Peoples Movement, a Nigerian political party

Other 
Actions per minute, a term used in real-time strategy games
Aspartame, an artificial, non-saccharide sweetener